Denis Trento  (born 2 June 1982 in Aosta) is an Italian ski mountaineer.

Selected results 
 2006:
 8th, World Championship vertical race
 2007:
 1st, European Championship relay race (together with Dennis Brunod, Manfred Reichegger and Guido Giacomelli)
 2008:
 1st, World Championship relay race (together with Dennis Brunod, Manfred Reichegger and Martin Riz)
 2009:
 1st, European Championship team race (together with Matteo Eydallin)
 1st, Tour du Rutor (together with Matteo Eydallin
 1st, Trofeo "Rinaldo Maffeis" (together with Matteo Eydallin)
 2nd, Dachstein Xtreme
 9th, European Championship single race
 2010:
 1st, Trophée des Gastlosen (ISMF World Cup), together with Guido Giacomelli
 2011:
 1st, World Championship team race, together with Matteo Eydallin
 1st, World Championship relay, together with Manfred Reichegger, Robert Antonioli and Matteo Eydallin
 5th, World Championship vertical, total ranking
 6th, World Championship single race
 1st, Tour du Rutor (together with Matteo Eydallin
 2012:
 6th, European Championship team, together with Matteo Eydallin

Pierra Menta 

 2006: 4th, together with Tony Sbalbi
 2007: 5th, together with Tony Sbalbi
 2009: 2nd, together with Matteo Eydallin
 2011: 3rd, together with Matteo Eydallin
 2012: 2nd, together with Matteo Eydallin

Trofeo Mezzalama 

 2005: 6th, together with Nicola Invernizzi and Alain Seletto
 2007: 3rd, together with Manfred Reichegger and Dennis Brunod
 2009: 1st, together with Manfred Reichegger and Matteo Eydallin

External links 
 Denis Trento bei Skimountaineering.org

References 

1982 births
Living people
Italian male ski mountaineers
World ski mountaineering champions
People from Aosta
Ski mountaineers of Gruppo Sportivo Esercito
Sportspeople from Aosta Valley